Matanawi (Matanauí, Mitandua, Moutoniway) was a divergent Amazonian language that appears to be distantly related to the Muran languages. It was originally spoken on the Castanha River and Madeirinha River in Amazonas State.

Vocabulary
The only existing word list for Matanawi is that of Curt Nimuendajú (1925).

Loukotka (1968) lists the following basic vocabulary items for Matanawí.

{| class="wikitable sortable"
! gloss !! Matanawí
|-
| one || yípaʔã
|-
| two || watoronaʔã
|-
| head || a-pazi
|-
| ear || a-tahuzi
|-
| tooth || a-rüzi
|-
| hand || ú-suzi
|-
| woman || mapivã
|-
| water || api
|-
| fire || uá
|-
| stone || ayá
|-
| maize || iwarí
|-
| tapir || awiyá
|}

References

Indigenous languages of the Americas
Extinct languages
Language isolates of South America